Daniel Spencer-Tonks is an English professional rugby league footballer who plays as a  or  for the Whitehaven RLFC in the Betfred Championship.

In September 2022 Spencer-Tonks made his Salford debut in the Super League against the Warrington Wolves.

References

External links
Salford Red Devils profile
SL profile
Widespread use of steroids as much a part of rugby’s culture as tying your laces
Super League breakthrough for Gloucester man Daniel Spencer-Tonks who was almost killed in a car crash and had four-year steroid ban
Super League joy for Gloucester man who came through horror crash and steroids ban

1995 births
Living people
English rugby league players
Rugby league players from Gloucestershire
Rugby league second-rows
Salford Red Devils players
Whitehaven R.L.F.C. players